Strachey is a surname. Notable people with the surname include:

Strachey family of Sutton Court, Somerset

John Strachey (d. 1674), friend of John Locke
John Strachey (geologist) (1671–1743), British geologist
Henry Strachey of Sutton Court, Somerset
Sir Henry Strachey, 1st Baronet (1737–1810), British politician and civil servant; son of Henry Strachey and grandson of the geologist John Strachey. He had at least two sons:
Sir Henry Strachey, 2nd Baronet (1772–1858), eldest son of the 1st baronet
Edward Strachey (1774–1832), second son of the 1st baronet; he was in the service of the East India Company. He had at least five sons, including:
Sir Edward Strachey, 3rd Baronet (1812–1901), eldest son of Edward Strachey (1774–1832) and nephew of the second baronet. He had three sons:
Edward Strachey, 1st Baron Strachie (1858–1936), Liberal politician; eldest son of the third baronet
Edward Strachey, 2nd Baron Strachie (1882–1973), son of the 1st Baron Strachie
Frances Constance Maddalena (d.1931), daughter of the 1st Baron Strachie. She was the first wife of Maurice Towneley-O'Hagan, 3rd Baron O'Hagan (1882–1961), British Liberal politician, they had at least one son:
Major Thomas Anthony Edward Towneley Strachey (died 1955), son of the 3rd Baron O'Hagan by his first wife Frances née Strachey, who changed his surname by deed poll to Strachey in September 1938, by which name his progeny are known. 
Charles Strachey, 4th Baron O'Hagan (born 1945), British Conservative politician; son of Major Thomas Strachey
John St. Loe Strachey (1860–1927), journalist and newspaper proprietor; second son of the third baronet. He had three sons, including:
John Strachey (politician) (1901–1963), British politician; third and youngest son of John St. Loe Strachey
Charles Strachey, presumed 6th Baronet (1934–2014)
Henry Strachey (artist) (1863–1940), painter, art critic and writer; third son of the third baronet
Henry Strachey (explorer) (1816–1912), second son of Edward Strachey (1774–1832) and younger brother of the 3rd baronet; he served in India as an officer in the Bengal Army and was responsible for surveying large portions of western Tibet. He had issue an only daughter
Julia Charlotte Chance, daughter of Henry Strachey (explorer). In 1884, she married barrister William Chance (later 2nd Baronet Chance), of the wealthy family which owned the glassmaking company Chance Brothers. The couple's residence,  Orchards, Surrey, was designed for them by Edwin Lutyens.
Richard Strachey (1817–1908), third son of Edward Strachey (1774–1832) and younger brother of the 3rd baronet; husband of the suffragette Jane Maria Strachey (1840–1928) and father of 10 surviving children, including:
Lytton Strachey (1880–1932), son of Richard; writer and thinker; among his prominent works are Eminent Victorians and a celebrated biography of Queen Victoria
Pernel Strachey (1876–1951), daughter of Richard; scholar and educationist; principal of Newnham College, Cambridge
James Strachey (1887–1967), son of Richard; psychoanalyst and biographer of Sigmund Freud; husband of psychoanalyst Alix Strachey (1892–1973)
Oliver Strachey (1874–1960), son of Richard; writer and cryptoanalyst; worked at Bletchley Park during WWII. His wives were Ruby Mayer and the feminist Ray Costelloe Strachey (1887–1940). He had three children:
Julia Strachey (1901–1979), writer; daughter of Oliver and his first wife Ruby Mayer
Barbara Strachey (1912–1999), writer; daughter of Oliver and his second wife Ray
Christopher Strachey (1916–1975), computer scientist; son of Oliver and his second wife Ray
Dorothy Bussy (née Strachey) (1865–1960), daughter of Richard, wife of French painter Simon Bussy; she wrote one novel, Olivia, about a lesbian relationship
Pippa Strachey (1872–1968), daughter of Richard, suffragist and feminist
John Strachey (civil servant) (1823–1907), fifth son of Edward Strachey (1774–1832) and younger brother of the 3rd baronet; served as an administrator in India. He married Katherine, daughter of Joseph Batten, principal of the East India Company College and had eight children, including:
Sir Arthur Strachey (1858–1901), son of John Strachey (civil servant). he served as a judge in India.
Winifred Barnes, daughter of John Strachey (civil servant). She was the wife of Indian civil servant Hugh Shakespear Barnes.

Others
Jack Strachey (1894–1972), English composer and songwriter
William Strachey the English writer and barrister

Fiction
Donald Strachey detective in Albany, NY